Events of 2023 in Honduras.

Incumbents 

 President:  Xiomara Castro 
 President of the National Congress: Luis Redondo

Events 
Ongoing – 2022–23 Honduran gang crackdown

 January 8 – President Xiomara Castro extends the state of emergency linked to the ongoing gang crackdown by 45 days.

See also 

COVID-19 pandemic in Honduras
2023 Atlantic hurricane season
Public holidays in Honduras

References 

 
2020s in Honduras
Honduras
Honduras
Years of the 21st century in Honduras